Sir James Smyth (c. 1621 – 18 November 1681) was an English politician who sat in the House of Commons from 1661 to 1681.

He was lieutenant-colonel and captain of the Tangier Regiment from its raising in 1661 until 1665, when he became lieutenant-colonel of the Coldstream Guards.

The Smyths were a prominent family in Exeter and he married a Cornish heiress. He was Member of Parliament for Exeter from 1661 until 1679, and Camelford from 1679 until his death in 1681.

He is regarded as the founder of Sir James Smith's School, Camelford (established 1679, modified 1962).

References

Dyer, Peter (2005) Tintagel: a portrait of a parish. Cambridge: Cambridge Books. ; p. 129

1620s births
1681 deaths
Members of the pre-1707 English Parliament for constituencies in Cornwall
Members of the Parliament of England (pre-1707) for Exeter
Coldstream Guards officers
Queen's Royal Regiment officers
English MPs 1661–1679
English MPs 1679
English MPs 1680–1681
English MPs 1681